Barritt's Ginger Beer is a brand of ginger beer produced in Bermuda by John Barritt & Son Ltd. It was first marketed in 1874. Barritt's is traditionally drunk on its own as a soft drink or as a mixer, famously half of the Dark 'N' Stormy cocktail.

Due to increased demand in the United States, Barritt's is now distributed there by the North American Beverage Company.

External links 
 Barritt's Bermuda
 Barritt's US

Companies of Bermuda
Bermudian cuisine
Food and drink companies of Bermuda
Ginger beer